The Asian Girls' U18 Volleyball Championship is a biennial competition contested by the under 18 women's national teams of the Asian Volleyball Confederation as part of the Asian Youth Volleyball Championship. 

Formerly, the championship was entitled Asian Girls' U17 Volleyball Championship, but in accordance with the FIVB Board of Administration Meeting on March 21–22, 2022 which announced to align the FIVB age group categories per gender to Under-19 and Under-21 for both genders, the adjustment of 2022 Age Group Championships has also been considered important for representative women’s age group teams from Asia to compete in the FIVB Age Group Championships in 2023.

Since the championships started in 1997, the tournaments have been won by two countries. Japan have won nine times including the 2022 edition and China have won four titles. The top 4 teams qualified for the FIVB Volleyball Girls' U19 World Championship.

Result summary

Teams reaching the top four

Champions by region

Hosts

Medal summary

Participating nations

Debut of teams

Awards

Most Valuable Player

Best Outside Spikers

Best Opposite Spiker

Best Setter

Best Middle Blockers

Best Libero

Former awards

Best Scorer

Best Spiker

Best Server

Best Blocker

Best Receiver

Best Digger

See also

 Asian Boys' U18 Volleyball Championship
 Asian Women's Volleyball Championship
 Asian Women's U23 Volleyball Championship
 Asian Women's U20 Volleyball Championship

External links
 Official AVC website

 

Asian Volleyball Confederation competitions
Biennial sporting events
V
Youth volleyball
Asian youth sports competitions
U18